This is a partial listing of prominent political families of Rajasthan.

However Royal families (who inherit their position automatically) are not included, unless certain later descendants have played political roles in a republican structure .

Families

Manikya Lal Verma Family

 Shri Manikya Lal Verma
-Freedom Fighter and Founder of Mewar Praja Manadal.
-First Prime Minister of Undivided Rajasthan.
- Member of Parliament of Loksabha from Tonk and Chittorgarh.
- Former President,Rajasthan Pradesh Congress Committee.
- Founder of Mahila Ashram School in Bhilwara for upliftment of Tribal Children's.

 Smt Naraini Devi Verma (Wife)

-Former Member of Parliament 
- Founder of Mahila Ashram School in Bhilwara for upliftment of Tribal Children's.

 Shri Deen Bandhu Verma (Son)

-Former Member of Parliament from Udaipur.
-Former Member of Legislative Assembly from Kapasan.
-Former Minister of State,Govt of Rajasthan.
-General Secretary ,RPCC,

The Jagan Family ( Sharma's ) 

Banwari Lal Sharma, Former Cabinet Minister and 5 time MLA from Dholpur Constituency 
Ashok Sharma, MLA and former Dholpur President of Congress
Murari Lal Sharma, Nagar Palika Chairman of Dholpur and activist in the BJP
Mithalesh Sharma, Pradhan
Ritesh Sharma, Mayor of Dholpur
Shilpi Sharma, Indian Actress

The Pilot Family 
  Rajesh Pilot, the former Central cabinet minister
  Rama Pilot, Former Member of Parliament.                            
 Sachin Pilot, Currently Member of the Legislative Assembly from Tonk, Rajasthan, Former DeputyChiefMinister and Former Union Minister in Government of India. (Son Of Rajesh Pilot) and husband of Sara Abdullah and  son in law of Farooq Abdullah

Mirdha Family

  Baldev Ram Mirdha
  Ram Niwas Mirdha, former central cabinet minister, son of Baldev Ram Mirdha
  Harendra Mirdha, Member Legislative Assembly, Minister in Rajasthan Cabinet
  Raghuvendra Mirdha, Member Rajasthan Pradesh Congress Committee
  Nathuram Mirdha
  Bhanu Prakash Mirdha,the former member of Lok Sabha, son of Nathuram Mirdha
  Richpal Mirdha, Member of Legislative Assembly
 Dr. Jyoti Mirdha, Member of Parliament

Vishnoi family

  Poonam Chand Vishnoi, former speaker Rajasthan Vidhansabha
  Vijay laxmi Bishnoi, Member of PCC, daughter of Poonam Chand Vishnoi

Ram Singh Bishnoi Family

  Ram Singh Bishnoi, former Cabinet Minister and 7 times member of Rajasthan Legislative Assembly.
Spouse = Amri Devi

Malkhan Singh Bishnoi, former member of Rajasthan Legislative Assembly, Son of Ram singh
Mahendra Bishnoi
Son of Malkhan Singh Bishnoi, MLA of Luni constituency in Jodhpur district.
 Party =  Indian National Congress

Singh family

  Jaswant Singh, former Central cabinet minister 
  Manvendra Singh, Member of Lok Sabha, son of Jaswant Singh

Gehlot family

  Ashok Gehlot, Chief Minister of Rajasthan (Third Term as CM), Elected 5 times as Member of Parliament and 5 times as Member of Legislative Assembly 
  Vaibhav Gehlot, Chairman, Rajasthan Cricket Association & son of Mr. Ashok Gehlot

Raje family

  Vasundhara Raje, Former Chief minister of Rajasthan
  Dushyant Singh, Lok Sabha Member, son of Vasundhara

Maderna Family
     
  Parasram Maderna, former state cabinet minister,PCC President,Speaker of Rajasthan Legislative Assembly
Mahipal Maderna, state cabinet minister
 Leela Maderna,Chairman of Apex Bank, Zila Parishad Member
Divya Maderna, Member of Rajasthan Legislative Assembly, Ex Zila Parisad member, Member Rajasthan Pradesh Congress Committee,All India Congress Committee Member

The Meena Family
Bharat lal meena former cabinet minister in Rajasthan government.
4 time MLA from bamanwas constituency.
 Namo Narain Meena, former minister of state, former union minister of state from congress party
 Harish Meena, former DGP of rajasthan and  MP of Dausa constituency from Bjp party
 Om Prakash Meena, chief secretary of rajasthan

References

Rajasthan

Rajasthan politics-related lists